Sir George Stephenson Beeby KBE (23 May 1869 – 18 July 1942) was an Australian politician, judge and author. He was one of the founders of the Labor Party in New South Wales, and represented the party in state parliament from 1907 to 1912. He fell out with the party and later served as an independent, a Nationalist, and a Progressive. He left parliament in 1920 to join the state arbitration court, and in 1926 was appointed to the Commonwealth Court of Conciliation and Arbitration. He was Chief Judge from 1939 until his retirement in 1941.

Early life
Beeby was born in Alexandria, Sydney, the second son of English-born Edward Augustus Beeby, a book-keeper, and his wife Isabel, née Thompson. Beeby was educated at Crown Street Public School and entered the education department of N.S.W. on 3 July 1884 where he became a pupil teacher at Macdonald Town (Erskineville) Public School. Subsequently he was an accountant, and in 1900 qualified as a solicitor. He had become interested in the land taxation proposals of Henry George in 1890 and was prominent in the beginnings of the New South Wales Labor Party. He stood as a Labor candidate at the 1894 election for Armidale, but finished 3rd with a margin of 188 votes (8.8%).

Beeby worked as a journalist for a while and then began practising as a solicitor. The 1901 arbitration act brought him much business; it was stated in 1906 that his firm had been concerned in two hundred disputes. He stood as the Labour candidate at the 1904 election for Leichhardt, but again finished 3rd. Beeby stood as a Labor candidate for Blayney at the by-election in January 1907 due to the resignation of W. P. (Paddy) Crick, but Beeby was defeated by 23 votes.

Parliamentary career

Beeby won the seat of Blayney for the Labor Party at the 1907 election, and with William Holman was successful in considerably modifying the amending industrial disputes bill brought in by Charles Wade. When James McGowen formed the first New South Wales Labor ministry in October 1910, Beeby was appointed Minister of Public Instruction and Minister for Labour and Industry from 21 October 1910 until 10 September 1911. There was a re-shuffle following protests at legislation on land ownership and Beeby was appointed Secretary for Lands, adding the portfolio of Labour and Industry in November 1911. In December 1912 he resigned from the ministry, parliament and Labor party in protest at the power of the extra-parliamentary Labor Party executive. He was re-elected for Blayney as an independent after a close fought by-election on 23 January 1913, with a margin of 136 votes (3.2%). Prior to the 1913 state election, he created the National Progressive Party and ran a slate of 10 candidates. Only he polled over 10 percent of the vote, winning 19.5 percent in the seat of Waverley. His voters helped elected a Labor candidate in the second round. He subsequently announced that his party had failed and there was no room for a third party in New South Wales.

Beeby had been called to the bar in 1911 and now worked up a successful practice as a barrister. When Holman formed his Nationalist ministry in November 1916 Beeby again was appointed Minister for Labour and Industry with a seat in the New South Wales Legislative Council. In 1918 Beeby, who had in the meanwhile been elected to the assembly for Wagga Wagga, succeeded in passing an industrial arbitration amendment act though it was strongly opposed by the Labour party. Towards the end of 1918 he visited Britain and the United States and, shortly after his return in June 1919, resigned from the government as a protest against administrative acts in connexion with the sale of wheat and the allotting of coal contracts. He joined the Progressive Party in 1920, with the introduction of proportional representation and was elected as the member for Murray, with the party winning 15 seats.

Judge

In August 1920, Beeby resigned from parliament to be appointed a judge of the New South Wales arbitration court. In 1926 he became a member of the Commonwealth Court of Conciliation and Arbitration bench. In the same year Beeby imposed an award favourable to the Federal Government's industrial policy which the Waterside Workers' Federation rejected. This resulted in strike action and later violence. Beeby was appointed chief judge in March 1939 and was knighted in the same year.

Late life and family
Beeby retired in 1941 and died on 18 July 1942. He married in 1892 and was survived by his wife, a son and three daughters. One daughter, Doris Isobel Beeby (1894–1948), was a communist party member and sought higher women's wages. His son, Edward Augustus (1892–1984), was (among other things) a musician and playwright. Edward opened the Patch Theatre Company in Perth WA in 1939.

Publications
Beeby was the author of Three Years of Industrial Arbitration in New South Wales (1906), a pamphlet; Concerning Ordinary People (1923), a volume of readable plays; In Quest of Pan (1924), a satire in verse on some of the Australian poets of the period; and A Loaded Legacy, a light novel which appeared in 1930.

Works
 Dregs.
 In Quest of Pan.
 One Touch O' Nature.
 Potter and Clay
 Still Waters.
 The Banner.
 The Creative Urge.
 The Point of View.
 Merely Margaret.

References

Further reading
Additional sources listed by the Dictionary of Australian Biography:
H. V. Evatt, Australian Labour Leader ; Burke's War Gazette, 1940.

Additional sources listed by the Australian Dictionary of Biography:
H. V. Evatt, Australian Labour Leader (Sydney, 1942)
U. Ellis, The Country Party (Melbourne, 1958)
B. Nairn, Civilising Capitalism (Canberra, 1973)
G. S. Harman, 'G. S. Beeby and the first Labor electoral battle in Armidale', Labour History Bulletin (Canberra), 1 (1962), no 3
A. Landa, 'The State industrial system', New South Wales Industrial Gazette, 109 (1953), no 3, supplement
'George S. Beeby and the new party', Lone Hand, 1 April 1913

 
 
 
 
 
 
Kate Baker papers (National Library of Australia)
G. S. Beeby letters (State Library of Victoria)
H. E. Boote papers (National Library of Australia)
Carruthers correspondence (State Library of New South Wales); J. C. Watson papers (National Library of Australia).
 

1869 births
1942 deaths
20th-century Australian judges
20th-century Australian novelists
Australian male novelists
Australian non-fiction writers
Members of the New South Wales Legislative Assembly
Members of the New South Wales Legislative Council
Australian Knights Commander of the Order of the British Empire
Australian politicians awarded knighthoods
Australian male poets
20th-century Australian dramatists and playwrights
Australian male dramatists and playwrights
20th-century Australian poets
20th-century Australian male writers
Male non-fiction writers